The Mosquito Philosophy is a 2019 Indian Tamil-language family drama film written and directed by Jayaprakash Radhakrishnan. The film tells the story about Suresh, the protagonist, who springs a surprise on his friends by announcing that he is to be wedded, where in fact it is Suresh himself who is in for a surprise. The film was released on OTT platform Mubi

Cast
 Pradeep Damodharan
 Sindhu Jayaprakash
 Ravi Kathiresan
 Suresh Somasundaram Kumar
 Anusha Prabhu
 Jayaprakash Radhakrishnan

Production

Development
The plot for The Mosquito Philosophy was born over drinks with Jayaprakash Radhakrishnan's friend Suresh, who eventually played the protagonist. With just a plot in hand, the shoot was planned for next evening. Director's friends and family agreed to participate. The scenes were shot sequentially, beginning with the drive to the nearest liquor store. There were no retakes or rehearsals. With no script in hand, everyone responded spontaneously to the developing plot from the depth of their own experiences. Originally, actress Shruti Haasan was to produce and present the film under her banner Isidro Media.

"In the film a character talks about Mosquito Philosophy, so I decided to name it that way. This film is a minimalistic one, done with an idea of doing a film with bare necessities" - Jayaprakash Radhakrishnan.

Music
Music was produced by Ayyo Rama in Bangalore, India.

Release
The film premiered at the 2019 Dhaka International Film Festival.

Festivals
The film was an official selection for multiple festivals:
 Chennai International Film Festival 2021
 Independent film festival of Chennai
 17th Dhaka International Film Festival (2019) – World Cinema, Bangladesh
 Nitte International Film Festival (2019) – India
 Habitat Film Festival (2019) – India

The film also had a special screening at the Cinemark Lincoln Square in Seattle.

Accolades
 Outstanding Achievement Award at the 2019 Cult Critics Movie Awards in India 
 Honorable Mention at  The Experimental Forum Film Festival (2019) in Los Angeles
 Best Story Award at the Lake City International Film Festival (2019)

References

External links

2010s Tamil-language films
2019 drama films
2019 films
Indian drama films
Indian independent films